Ernst Diesen (6 April 1913 – 14 November 1970) was a Norwegian revue and film actor and theatre director.

Biography
He was born in Kristiania (now Oslo), Norway. He was the son of Andreas Melchior Seip Diesen (1881–1958) and Sofie Elisabeth Aars Brodtkorb (1885–1968). In 1937, he married the singer and revue actress Kari Diesen (1914–1987).

Diesen studied at the theater school operated by Max Reinhardt in Berlin from 1932 to 1933. He was a student at Det Nye Teater from 1933 to 1934. He worked for the revue theatre Chat Noir from 1934 to 1942 and as theater director from 1950 to 1953. He was at the Edderkoppen Theatre from 1943 to 1950 and again from 1954 to 1959.

He also acted in several films, including the comedy films Bør Børson Jr. from 1938, Den forsvundne pølsemaker from 1941, Det æ'kke te å tru from 1942, and Pappa tar gull from 1964.

References

1913 births
1970 deaths
Male actors from Oslo
Norwegian male stage actors
Norwegian male film actors
Norwegian theatre directors
20th-century Norwegian male actors